Eugent is a given name. Notable people with the name include:

Eugent Bushpepa (born 1984), Albanian singer, songwriter, and composer
Eugent Zeka (born 1974), Italian and Albanian football coach

See also
Eugen
Nugent (surname)